Maria Anna Josepha of Austria (20 December 1654 – 4 April 1689) was born an archduchess of Austria as the daughter of Ferdinand III, Holy Roman Emperor, and later became Electoral Princess of the Palatinate as the wife of Johann Willhelm, Elector Palatine.

Life

Early life 
Archduchess Maria Anna Josepha was born on 30 December 1654 as the third child and daughter of to Ferdinand III, Holy Roman Emperor (1608–1657) and his third wife, Eleonora Gonzaga (1630–1686). She also had had seven half-siblings from the previous two marriages of her father, only four of whom were still alive at the time of her birth. Two months after she was born, her eldest full sibling, Archduchess Theresa Maria Josepha (1652–1653) died at the age of one and a half years. Her only younger sibling, Archduke Ferdinand Joseph Alois (1657–1658) was born in 1657 and died in infancy.

Marriage 
On 25 October 1678, twenty-four-years-old Maria Anna married twenty-years-old Electoral Prince Johann Wilhelm (John William) (1658–1716) from the House of Wittelsbach in Wiener Neustadt. He was the eldest son and heir of Philip William, Elector Palatine (1615–1690), and the brother-in-law of Maria Anna's eldest brother, Leopold I, Holy Roman Emperor (1640–1705). The wedding ceremony was performed by Archbishop Leopold Karl von Kollonitsch.  The couple settled in Düsseldorf and led an elaborate household there. In 1679, her father-in-law gifted them the United Duchies of Jülich-Cleves-Berg. Upon Philip William's death, Johann Wilhelm became Elector Palatine and Duke of Neuburg.

Issue 
During her marriage, Maria Anna gave birth to two children, but neither survived infancy:

 Son (born and died 6 February 1683).
 Son (born and died 5 February 1686).

Death 
Maria Anna died of tuberculosis during a visit in Vienna. She was buried there in the Imperial Crypt beneath the Capuchin Church, the principal place of burial for members of the House of Habsburg.

Ancestry

Notes

References
Harm Klueting, Wolfgang Schmale: The Empire and its territorial states in the 17th and 18th centuries, Volume 10, LIT Edit. Münster, 2004, p. 69.
Constantin von Wurzbach: Maria Anna Josepha. Nr. 219. In: Biographisches Lexikon des Kaiserthums Oesterreich, vol. 7, Edit. L. C. Zamarski, Vienna 1861, p. 29.

External links

1654 births
1689 deaths
17th-century House of Habsburg
17th-century Austrian women
17th-century deaths from tuberculosis
Austrian princesses
Electoral Princesses of the Palatinate
Countesses Palatine of Neuburg
House of Wittelsbach
German royalty
Burials at the Imperial Crypt
Duchesses of Jülich
Duchesses of Berg
Tuberculosis deaths in Austria
Daughters of emperors
Children of Ferdinand III, Holy Roman Emperor
Daughters of kings